Squaring the circle is a geometric problem of constructing a circle and square of equal area, with compass and straightedge, proven to be impossible. "Squaring the circle" may also refer to:
Squaring the Circle (album), 2021 electronic music album by Sneaker Pimps
"Squaring the Circle", track on 2013 avante-garde music album Psychomagia by Abraxas
"Squaring The Circle", track on 2004 avante-garde metal album Bathos by Aarni
Squaring the Circle, 1984 television play by Tom Stoppard
Squaring the Circle, 1977 fantasy novel by Niel Hancock
"Squaring the Circle", 1977 episode of British television fantasy series Children of the Stones
Squaring the Circle, 1936 English translation of 1931 play by Valentin Kataev
"Squaring the Circle", 1908 short story by O. Henry

See also
Square the Circle (disambiguation)
Squared circle (disambiguation)